Joe McAlister may refer to:

Joe McAlister, character in Under the Dome (TV series)
Joe McAlister (athlete) in 2006 IAAF World Road Running Championships